Clear Creek is a stream in Boone and Story counties, Iowa, in the United States. It is a tributary to Ioway Creek, known as Squaw Creek until 2021.

Clear Creek was descriptively named on account of its clear water.

References

Rivers of Boone County, Iowa
Rivers of Story County, Iowa
Rivers of Iowa